Nabilai Kibunguchy (born January 5, 1998) is an American soccer player.

Career

Youth
Kibunguchy was part of the Sacramento Republic from 2015 to 2016, where he made 30 appearances and scored a single goal.

College
Kibunguchy played college soccer at the University of California, Davis from 2016 to 2019. During his time with the Aggies, Kibunguchy made 52 appearances, scoring 3 goals and tallying 2 assists. Kibunguchy redshirted his freshman season following a season-ending injury and the Big West Conference was cancelled in 2020 due to the COVID-19 pandemic. During his college career, Kibunguchy was named All-Big West Conference First Team, Big West All-Freshman Team and Big West Conference All-Academic Team in 2017, and United Soccer Coaches All-Far West Region Second Team and All-Big West Conference First Team in 2019.

In 2019, Kibunguchy also appeared in the USL League Two with San Francisco Glens, where he earned a spot on the Western Conference All-Star Team.

Professional
On January 21, 2021, Kibunguchy was selected 18th overall in 2021 MLS SuperDraft by Minnesota United. He officially signed with the team on April 3, 2021.

On May 27, 2021, Kibunguchy moved on loan to USL Championship side Sacramento Republic for the remainder of the 2021 season. 

Following the 2022 season, his contract option was declined by Minnesota.

Personal
Both of Kibunguchy's parents are from Kenya.

References

External links

1998 births
American soccer players
Association football defenders
Living people
Minnesota United FC draft picks
Minnesota United FC players
People from Elk Grove, California
Sacramento Republic FC players
San Francisco Glens players
Soccer players from California
UC Davis Aggies men's soccer players
United States men's youth international soccer players
USL League Two players
USL Championship players
American people of Kenyan descent
MLS Next Pro players
Major League Soccer players